Nighttime Calls is Sylver's third studio album, released on 25 October 2004 in Europe. The title 'Nighttime Calls' refers to the long, drawn out late-night telephone conversations that were made by Sylver when they are discussing the musical content and new songs that were to appear on the album.
 
Track listing
Love Is an Angel (3:21)
Take Me Back (3:20)
Summer Solstice (5:23)
Who Am I (3:44)
Make It (3:13)
Drowning in My Tears (3:59)
Sympathy (2:51)
Changed (3:40)
Where Did the Love Go (3:37)
Fallin' (2:56)
Tomorrow (3:31)
Don't Call Me (2:58)
Where Did I Go Wrong (3:02)
Sometimes (3:35)

Charts

Release history

References:

References 

2004 albums
Sylver albums